The 300 metres is an uncommon (meaning not on an Olympic or World Championship program) sprinting event in track and field competitions.

All-time top 25
+ = en route to 400 m performance
i = indoor performance
A = affected by altitude
OT = oversized track (> 200 m in circumference)
h = hand timing

Men
Correct as of February 2023.

Notes
Below is a list of other times equal or superior to 31.87:
Wayde Van Niekerk also ran 31.03 (2016), 31.04 (2016) and 31.63 (2015).
LaShawn Merritt also ran 31.23 (2016), 31.30 (2009), 31.31 (2006), 31.53 (2015), 31.68 (2007).
Michael Johnson also ran 31.55 (1995), 31.56 (1994), 31.64 (1996), 31.66 (1999), 31.72 (1993).
Steven Gardiner also ran 31.56  (2022), 31.83 (2020).
Roberto Hernández also ran 31.69 (1990).
Isaac Makwala also ran 31.77 (2018).
Jeremy Wariner also ran 31.72 (2008).

Women
Correct as of February 2023.

Notes
Below is a list of other times equal or superior to 35.81:
Marita Koch also ran 34.66 (1984).
Jarmila Kratochvílová also ran 35.06 (1983).
Shaunae Miller-Uibo also ran 35.45  (2018), 35.71  (2017).
Olga Bryzgina also ran 35.47 (1988).
Kathy Cook also ran 35.51 (1983), 35.8  (1982).
Svetlana Goncharenko also ran 35.69   (1999).
Abby Steiner also ran 35.80  (2021)

References

Events in track and field
Sprint (running)